Mikhail Konstantinovich Sidorov (March 16, 1823, Arkhangelsk – July 12, 1887, Aachen, both Old Style dates) was a Siberian goldmine owner.
Sidorov was also pioneering entrepreneur in Russia’s Arctic who had a vision for the development of trade along the Northern Sea Route.
Along with wealthy Swedish merchant and philanthropist of Scottish origin Oskar Dickson, Sidorov sponsored voyages to the Siberian North for several years.

Sidorov or Sidorova Island in the Arkticheskiy Institut group of the Kara Sea was named after him.

References

Red Arctic: Polar Exploration and the Myth of the North in the Soviet Union
Russian-Norwegian Relations in Arctic Europe: The History of the "Barents Euro-Arctic Region"
The Northern Sea Route: Its Place in Russian Economic History before 1917

1823 births
1887 deaths
Explorers from the Russian Empire
Explorers of Siberia
Explorers of the Arctic
Kara Sea
Burials at Lazarevskoe Cemetery (Saint Petersburg)